Nero and the Burning of Rome is a 1953 Italian epic historical drama film directed by Primo Zeglio and loosely based on real life events of Roman emperor Nero. It was based on the novel Nerone e Messalina (c.1949) by Harry Bluhmen.

Plot
Although Valeria Messalina makes a brief appearance in the film, the Messalina of the film's Italian title is Nero's third wife, Statilia Messalina, who appears towards the end. The dissolute Nero has come to the imperial throne through the machinations of his mother Julia Agrippina, whom he later murders. Among his other prominent victims are his tutor Seneca the Younger and his first two wives, Claudia Octavia and Poppea Sabina. One of his mistresses, the slave girl Claudia Acte, is portrayed in the film as a Christian who introduces the emperor to their teachings and flees on learning her lover's identity. During this upheaval, Nero overturns a lamp, which leads to the burning of Rome. This he blames on the Christians and orders a general persecution, in which Acte dies. When the populace eventually rises against him, Nero takes refuge with one of his freedmen and is killed by a slave.

Cast 

 Gino Cervi as Nero 
 Paola Barbara as  Agrippina 
 Yvonne Sanson as  Stabilia Messalina 
 Milly Vitale as  Atte 
 Jole Fierro as  Poppaea Sabina   
 Steve Barclay as charioteer  
 Ludmilla Dudarova as  Valeria Messalina 
 Carlo Giustini as  Britannicus 
 Lamberto Picasso as  Seneca 
 Renzo Ricci as Petronius
 Carlo Tamberlani as  Tigellinus (credited as Renzo Tamberlani) 
 Silvana Jachino 
 Memmo Carotenuto 
 Elsa Vazzoler  
 Cesare Bettarini

Release
Nero and the Burning of Rome was released in Italy on 28 August 1953.

See also
 List of Italian films of 1953

References

Footnotes

Sources

External links

Nero and the Burning of Rome at Variety Distribution

1953 films
1950s biographical films
Peplum films
Italian biographical films
Films directed by Primo Zeglio
Films set in ancient Rome
Films set in the Roman Empire
Films set in the 1st century
Depictions of Nero on film
Biographical films about Roman emperors
Cultural depictions of Agrippina the Younger
Cultural depictions of Messalina
Cultural depictions of Poppaea Sabina
Cultural depictions of Seneca the Younger
Sword and sandal films
Italian historical drama films
1950s historical drama films
Italian black-and-white films
1950s Italian films